German submarine U-510 was a Type IXC U-boat of Nazi Germany's Kriegsmarine during World War II, which later served in the French Navy. The submarine was laid down on 1 November 1940 at the Deutsche Werft yard at Hamburg as yard number 306, launched on 4 September 1941, and commissioned on 25 November 1941 under the command of Korvettenkapitän Karl Neitzel.

After training with the 4th U-boat Flotilla at Stettin, U-510 was transferred to the 10th U-boat Flotilla based at Lorient in occupied France, for front-line service on 1 August 1942. Kapitänleutnant Alfred Eick took command of the U-boat on 22 May 1943, and she was transferred to the 33rd flotilla on 1 October 1944 while operating in Southeast Asian waters. During her seven war patrols the U-boat sank twelve ships totalling , damaged eight, totalling 53,289 GRT and cause three total loss, totalling 24,338 GRT.

The U-boat was captured by American forces at Saint-Nazaire on 10 May 1945. Renamed Bouan she served in the French Navy from 1947 until struck on 1 May 1959. The submarine was broken up in 1960.

Design
German Type IXC submarines were slightly larger than the original Type IXBs. U-510 had a displacement of  when at the surface and  while submerged. She had two shafts and two  propellers.

U-510 was fitted with six  torpedo tubes (four fitted at the bow and two at the stern), 22 torpedoes, one  SK C/32 naval gun with 180 rounds, as well as two anti-aircraft guns, one of  SK C/30 and one of  C/30. The boat had a complement of forty-eight men.

Service history

First patrol
U-510 departed Kiel on 7 July 1942, negotiated the gap between Iceland and the Faroe Islands and sailed across the Atlantic to the northern coast of South America. There she attacked three ships and sank the 5,285 GRT Uruguayan merchant ship Maldonado on 2 August. She also damaged the 8,016 GRT British tanker  on 10 August, and sank the 4,971 GRT British merchant ship Cressington Court on 19 August. The U-boat docked at Lorient on 13 September.

Second patrol
U-510 departed Lorient on 14 October 1942 and patrolled the waters west of the Canary Islands. After "Operation Torch" began on 8 November, The boat was ordered to patrol the coast of Morocco, but was bombed by an unidentified aircraft, causing a serious oil leak. She returned to Lorient on 12 December.

Third patrol
The U-boat sailed from Lorient once more on 16 January 1943 and headed across the Atlantic to the northern coast of South America. She attacked the same convoy again three hours later and this time damaged the Liberty ships Mark Hanna, James Smith, Thomas Ruffin and James K. Polk, the latter two so badly that they were later declared total losses. The U-boat returned to Lorient on 16 April.

Fourth patrol
Now under the command of Oberleutnant zur See Alfred Eick, U-510 sailed from Lorient on 3 June 1943 and once again headed for the northern South American coast. On 8 July she made a series of attacks on Convoy TJ-1, sinking the 10,324 GRT Norwegian tanker B.P. Newton and the 6,900 GRT American merchant ship Eldena, and damaging the 3,702 GRT Latvian merchant ship Everagra. Two days later, on 10 May, she sank the 1,641 GRT Swedish merchant ship Scandinavia. The U-boat returned to Lorient on 29 August.

Fifth patrol
U-510 left Lorient on 3 November 1943, sailed around the Cape of Good Hope and into the Indian Ocean to operate off the Arabian Peninsula.

On 22 February 1944, she made two attacks on Convoy PA-69 about 200 miles off Aden, sinking the 9,181 GRT American tanker E.G. Seubert and the 7,385 GRT British tanker San Alvaro; she also damaged the 9,970 GRT Norwegian tanker Erling Brøvig.

The U-boat then shaped a course for Penang in Malaya (now Malaysia), making three more attacks en route. On 7 March she torpedoed and sank the unescorted 7,229 GRT Norwegian merchant ship Tarifa about 250 miles east of Socotra in the Indian Ocean. On 19 March she sank the American 7,176 GRT Liberty ship John A. Poor in the Arabian Sea, and on 27 March the 249 GRT British naval trawler HMS Maaløy (J136) off Ceylon (now Sri Lanka), killing Prince Hassan Farid Didi, the son of HRH Abdul Majeed Didi, Sultan Elect of the Maldives, who was aboard as a passenger. Prince Hassan was Minister of the Interior and de facto head of the Government of the Sultanate of the Maldives. U-510 arrived at Penang on 5 April after a voyage of 155 days, her longest patrol.

Sixth patrol
Operating as part of the Monsun Gruppe U-510 sailed to Singapore and then to Kobe, Japan, before returning to Batavia (now Jakarta). From there, on 26 November 1944, she sailed on her only combat patrol, returning to Batavia on 3 December having had no successes.

Seventh patrol
U-510 left Batavia on 11 January 1945 for the voyage back to Europe. U-510 carried with her a load of tungsten, tin, quinine, etc. from the Far East.

After being supplied with oil southeast of Madagascar by KKpt Oesten's U-861, which was short of fuel herself, U-510 ran out of fuel in the North Atlantic, but somehow managed to reach base at Saint-Nazaire, in France, on 23 April after 103 days at sea.

Post war
American forces captured U-510 at Saint-Nazaire on 10 May 1945. Awarded to the French in 1946, she was commissioned into the French Navy, and renamed Bouan (S.612) on 24 June 1947. She served until struck on 1 May 1959, renamed hull Q.176 on 23 November 1959, and was broken up in 1960.

Wolfpacks
U-510 took part in two wolfpacks, namely:
 Streitaxt (20 October – 2 November 1942) 
 Schlagetot (9 – 21 November 1942)

Summary of raiding history

References

Bibliography

External links

 Bouan (S.612) at u-boote.fr 

World War II submarines of Germany
German Type IX submarines
U-boats commissioned in 1941
Indian Ocean U-Boats
1941 ships
Ships built in Hamburg
Captured U-boats
G
Cold War submarines of France